Evangeline is an unincorporated community in Acadia Parish, Louisiana, United States. Evangeline has a post office with ZIP code 70537.

References

Unincorporated communities in Acadia Parish, Louisiana
Unincorporated communities in Louisiana